Worle Community School is a coeducational Academy located in Worle, a suburb of Weston-super-Mare in North Somerset, England

There are currently 1,377 students aged 11 to 16 in the school.

The school received media attention in early 2016 after a student was stabbed.

Pupils studying at the school included children's writer-illustrator and actor and songwriter (and former musician performer), Peter James Trapani.

History
Worle Community School was founded in 1850 located at Spring Hill, near Worle High Street which is now the present site of St Martin's C of E Junior School. In 1971, it moved to Redwing Drive where its present location is. It became the first school in the county of Somerset to be purposely built as a Comprehensive School and also became one of the first schools in the former Avon county as an Investor in People. In recent times, the school has achieved Arts College status and Specialist school status. In 2002, the school was renamed to Worle Community School in relation to its service to the community of the village of Worle.

In recent years, the school has invested in many new facilities, building a new sixth form centre linked with Weston College. In September 2007, the school opened a new restaurant within the school grounds, serving students with healthy choices. The school also has a drama studio and dance studio fitted with lighting and professional flooring. There is also a recording studio in the school called Redwing Studios and many students use it for GCSE composition recordings. There is also a new 3rd Generation Turf pitch and Sports Facility that were opened in January 2013.

Since March 1, 2017, Worle Community School is now an Academy as part of The Priory Learning Trust.

Nathan Jenkins is The Executive Principal of The PLT. Mark Tidman is the current school principal.

Exam results
In the academic year 2018/2019, the school's Progress 8 benchmark score was -0.26 which was behind average compared to the average score of all state-funded schools in England which was -0.03. In addition, the school was behind average in the Progress 8 benchmark score compared to the North Somerset average score, -0.2 and the Priory Community School score of -0.13. The school's Attainment 8 score was 42.4, lower than the Priory Community School score of 44 and lower than North Somerset's Attainment 8 score of 46.1 
The percentage of pupils who achieved grade 5 or above in English and maths GCSEs was 32%, lower than the Priory Community School score of 33% and also lower compared to the North Somerset percentage, 42%.

Notable former pupils
Jill Dando, journalist and broadcaster, was a student at the school until 1978.

References

External links

Secondary schools in North Somerset
Schools in Weston-super-Mare
Academies in North Somerset
1850 establishments in England